Alt Maestrat is a comarca in the province of Castellón, Valencian Community, Spain.

Municipalities 

The comarca of Alt Maestrat is composed of nine municipalities, listed below with their populations at the 2001 and 2011 Censuses, and according to the most recent official estimates (for 1 January 2019):

References

 
Comarques of the Valencian Community
Geography of the Province of Castellón
Maestrazgo